Acacia camptoclada is a shrub belonging to the genus Acacia and the subgenus Phyllodineae endemic to arid parts of Western Australia. 

It has slightly sticky and polished branchlets with easily detached stipules. The crowded, ascending to erect glaucous green phyllodes have an asymmetrical oblanceolate to narrowly oblong shape. It blooms from August to October and produces yellow flowers. The inflorescences occur in groups of two to five and have showy spherical heads containing 15 to 21 golden flowers.

The shrub belongs to the Acacia prainii group and is closely related to Acacia dorsenna and Acacia prainii.

It is native to an area in the eastern Wheatbelt and Goldfields-Esperance regions of Western Australia where it is found in low-lying areas, on sandplains and dunes growing in sandy or clay soils. The range extends from Newdegate in the west to around Balladonia in the east and is often part of mallee or ''Eucalyptus woodland communities.

See also
 List of Acacia species

References

camptoclada
Acacias of Western Australia
Plants described in 1904
Taxa named by Cecil Rollo Payton Andrews